Bianca Maria Berlinguer (born 9 December 1959 in Rome) is an Italian journalist. She was the director of TG3 from October 2009 to August 2016.

Biography 
The first of the four children of the Italian Communist Party leader Enrico Berlinguer and Letizia Laurenti (the other siblings are Maria Stella,  and Laura, journalist of Studio Aperto), Bianca Berlinguer is married in second marriage with the politician Luigi Manconi.

She holds a degree in literature from La Sapienza University of Rome and after a period of training at Radiocorriere TV, at the beginning of the 1980s she started working at Il Messaggero and at the same time worked at Mixer (1985) as an editor. She later joined the TG3 newsroom on a permanent basis. She presented the TG3 evening edition uninterruptedly since 1991. She also presented Primo piano, an in-depth programme on Rai 3.

On 1 October 2009 she was appointed director of the TG3. She took office on 12 October. On 24 September 2010 she won the first edition of the journalism prize "L'isola che c'è", awarded to 10 Sardinian journalists working in Rome for the printed press or the RAI - Radiotelevisione italiana. As director she continues to lead (after a gap of some months) the evening edition of TG3, and the in-depth programme Linea Notte.

She led the TG3 for the last time on 5 August 2016 and was succeeded by Luca Mazzà.

Since 7 November 2016, she has conducted the programme Cartabianca on Rai 3. 

In 2019 she published her first book, a biography on her long time friend Marcella Di Folco,  character actor with Federico Fellini and transgender activist died in 2010, Storia di Marcella che fu Marcello. The book was finalist at the Premio Caccuri 2020.

References 

1959 births
Italian women journalists
Living people